This is the list of individuals who ruled Safavid Georgia. The territory of the province was principally made up of the two subordinate eastern Georgian kingdoms of Kartli and Kakheti and, briefly, parts of the Principality of Samtskhe. The city of Tiflis (present-day Tbilisi) was its administrative center, the base of Safavid power in the province, and the seat of the rulers of Kartli. It also housed an important Safavid mint. Safavid rule was mainly exercised through the approval or appointment of Georgian royals of the Bagrationi dynasty, at times converts to Shia Islam, as valis or khans. The eastern Georgian kingdoms had been subjected in the early 16th century, their rulers did not commonly convert. Tiflis was garrisoned by an Iranian force as early as IsmailI's reign, but relations between the Georgians and Safavids at the time mostly bore features of traditional vassalage. Davud Khan (David XI) was the first Safavid-appointed ruler, whose placement on the throne of Kartli in 1562 marked the start of nearly two and a half centuries of Iranian political dominance over eastern Georgia.

Safavid valis, khans, and vassals

of Kartli

of Kakheti

of (eastern) Samtskhe–Meskheti

Notes

References

Sources
 
  
 

Government of Safavid Iran
Safavid appointed rulers of Samtskhe
Safavid governors of Kartli
Safavid governors of Kakheti